Henry Bilson-Legge  (29 May 1708 – 23 August 1764) was an English statesman. He notably served three times as Chancellor of the Exchequer in the 1750s and 1760s.

Background and education
Bilson-Legge was the fourth son of William Legge, 1st Earl of Dartmouth, by his wife Lady Anne, daughter of Heneage Finch, 1st Earl of Aylesford. He was educated at Christ Church, Oxford.

Political career

He became private secretary to Sir Robert Walpole. In 1739 was appointed Chief Secretary for Ireland by the Lord Lieutenant, William Cavendish, 3rd Duke of Devonshire; being chosen Member of Parliament for the borough of East Looe in 1740, and for Orford, Suffolk, at the general election in the succeeding year.

Legge only shared temporarily in the downfall of Walpole, and became in quick succession Surveyor-General of Woods and Forests, a Lord of the Admiralty, and a Lord of the Treasury. In 1748 he was sent as envoy extraordinary to Frederick the Great, and although his conduct in Berlin was sharply censured by George II, he became Treasurer of the Navy soon after his return to England. In April 1754 he joined the ministry of the duke of Newcastle as chancellor of the Exchequer, the king consenting to this appointment although refusing to hold any intercourse with the minister; but Legge shared the elder Pitt's dislike of the policy of paying subsidies to the Landgrave of Hesse, and was dismissed from office in November 1755.

Twelve months later he returned to his post at the exchequer in the administration of Pitt and the 4th Duke of Devonshire, retaining office until April 1757 when he shared both the dismissal and the ensuing popularity of Pitt. When, in conjunction with the Duke of Newcastle, Pitt returned to power in the following July, Legge became chancellor of the exchequer for the third time. He imposed new taxes upon houses and windows, and the king refused to make him a peer.

In 1754 Legge took the additional name of Bilson on secondarily succeeding to the West Mapledurham estate in Buriton near Petersfield, Hampshire of his cousin, Leonard Bilson MP (1681-1715 - son of Susanna Legge, sister of Henry Legge's grandfather, George Legge, 1st Baron Dartmouth) upon the death of the original heir, Thomas Bettesworth, without issue.

In 1759 he obtained the sinecure position of surveyor of the petty customs and subsidies in the port of London, and having in consequence to resign his seat in parliament he was chosen one of the members for Hampshire, a proceeding which greatly incensed the Earl of Bute, who desired this seat for one of his friends. Having thus incurred Bute's displeasure Legge was again dismissed from the exchequer in March 1761, but he continued to take part in parliamentary debates until his death at Tunbridge Wells in 1764. 

Pitt called Legge, the child, and deservedly the favourite child, of the Whigs. Horace Walpole said he was of a creeping, underhand nature, and aspired to the lion's place by the manoeuvre of the mole, but afterwards he spoke in high terms of his talents.

He "was a person of great abilities, both as a statesman and financier, and went through most of the great offices of government with reputation and integrity, and quitted them to the great regret of the nation in general."

Family
Henry Bilson-Legge married Mary Stawell, daughter and heiress of Edward Stawell, 4th and last Baron Stawell (d. 1755). In 1760, Mary, who had been made 1st Baroness Stawell of the second creation, bore Henry Bilson-Legge's only child, Henry (1757–1820), who became the 2nd Baron Stawell on his mother's death in 1780. When the 2nd Baron Stawell died without sons the title became extinct again.  His only daughter, Mary (d. 1864), married John Dutton, 2nd Baron Sherborne.

References

Further reading

External links 

1708 births
1764 deaths
Younger sons of earls
Chancellors of the Exchequer of Great Britain
Whig (British political party) MPs for English constituencies
Members of the Parliament of Great Britain for English constituencies
Members of the Parliament of Great Britain for constituencies in Cornwall
Members of the Privy Council of Great Britain
Fellows of the Royal Society
British MPs 1734–1741
British MPs 1741–1747
British MPs 1747–1754
British MPs 1754–1761
Henry
Chief Secretaries for Ireland
Lords of the Admiralty